Adolf Weil (7 February 1848, Heidelberg23 July 1916, Wiesbaden) was a German physician after whom Weil's disease is named.

Weil studied medicine at the University of Heidelberg, and afterwards furthered his education in Berlin and Vienna. From 1872 to 1876 he was an assistant to Friedrich Theodor von Frerichs (1819–1885) in Berlin. In 1886, he was appointed professor of special pathology and therapy at the University of Dorpat, but resigned shortly afterwards, after contracting tuberculosis of the larynx and permanently losing his voice. Later he lived and worked in Ospitaletto, San Remo and Badenweiler, relocating to Wiesbaden in 1893, where he died in 1916.

In 1913, in collaboration with Emil Abderhalden (1877–1950) he isolated an alpha-amino acid known as norleucine. Among his written works was a treatise on the auscultation of arteries and veins, Die Auscultation der Arterien und Venen (1875), and a monograph titled Handbuch und Atlas der topographischen Percussion (Handbook and atlas of topographical percussion) (1877).

Shortly after receiving news that Weil's disease was caused by a spirochete, he died of acute hemoptysis.

References

External links
 JewishEncyclopedia.com - WEIL, ADOLF: at jewishencyclopedia.com
 Adolf Weil @ Who Named It.

1848 births
1916 deaths
German pathologists
Physicians from Heidelberg
Academic staff of the University of Tartu